Saint-Marcellin may refer to:

 Saint-Marcellin, a soft French cheese made from cow's milk
 Saint-Marcellin, Isère, a commune in south-eastern France
 Saint-Marcellin, Quebec,  a parish municipality located in the Rimouski-Neigette Regional County Municipality
 Saint-Marcellin-lès-Vaison, a commune in the Vaucluse department in southeastern France

See also
 Saint-Marcel (disambiguation)
 Marcellin (disambiguation)